The Tutsi, also called Watusi, Watutsi or Abatutsi, are an ethnic group of the African Great Lakes region. They are a Bantu-speaking ethnic group and the second largest of three main ethnic groups in Rwanda and Burundi (the other two being the largest Bantu ethnic group Hutu and the Pygmy group of the Twa).

Historically, the Tutsi were pastoralists and filled the ranks of the warriors' caste. Before 1962, they regulated and controlled Rwandan society, which was composed of Tutsi aristocracy and Hutu commoners, utilizing a clientship structure. They occupied the dominant positions in the sharply stratified society and constituted the ruling class.

Origins and classification

The definition of "Tutsi" people have changed through time and location. Social structures were not stable throughout Rwanda, even during colonial times under the Belgian rule. The Tutsi aristocracy or elite was distinguished from Tutsi commoners.

When the Belgian colonists conducted censuses, they wanted to identify the people throughout Rwanda-Burundi according to a simple classification scheme. They defined "Tutsi" as anyone owning more than ten cows (a sign of wealth) or with the physical features of a longer thin nose, high cheekbones, and being over six feet tall, all of which are common descriptions associated with the Tutsi.

In the colonial era, the Tutsi were hypothesized to have arrived in the Great Lakes region from the Horn of Africa.

Tutsis were considered by some to be of Cushitic origin, although they do not speak a Cushitic language, and have lived in the areas where they presently inhabit for at least 400 years, leading to considerable intermarriage with the Hutu in the area. Due to the history of intermingling and intermarrying of Hutus and Tutsis, some ethnographers and historians are of the view that Hutu and Tutsis cannot be called distinct ethnic groups.

Genetics

Y-DNA (paternal lineages)
Modern-day genetic studies of the Y-chromosome generally indicate that the Tutsi, like the Hutu, are largely of Bantu extraction (60% E1b1a, 20% B, 4% E-P2(xE1b1a)). 

Paternal genetic influences associated with the Horn of Africa and North Africa are few (under 3% E1b1b-M35), and are ascribed to much earlier inhabitants who were assimilated. However, the Tutsi have considerably more haplogroup B Y-DNA paternal lineages (14.9% B) than do the Hutu (4.3% B).

mtDNA (maternal lineages)
There are no peer-reviewed genetic studies of the Tutsi's mtDNA or maternal lineages. However, Fornarino et al. (2009) report that unpublished data indicates that one Tutsi individual from Rwanda carries the India-associated mtDNA haplogroup R7.
Further individual 23andme DNA tests suggest that Tutsi mtDNA lineages are associated with local East African hunter-gatherer maternal haplogroups, particularly haplogroup L0, with very few associated with West African mtDNA lineages. A good number also carry West-Eurasian mtDNA lineages, particularly M1a, K1a; but also J1 and R0.

Autosomal DNA (overall ancestry)
In general, the Tutsi appear to share a close genetic kinship with neighboring Bantu populations, particularly the Hutus. However, it is unclear whether this similarity is primarily due to extensive genetic exchanges between these communities through intermarriage or whether it ultimately stems from common origins:

[...] generations of gene flow obliterated whatever clear-cut physical distinctions may have once existed between these two Bantu peoples – renowned to be height, body build, and facial features. With a spectrum of physical variation in the peoples, Belgian authorities legally mandated ethnic affiliation in the 1920s, based on economic criteria. Formal and discrete social divisions were consequently imposed upon ambiguous biological distinctions. To some extent, the permeability of these categories in the intervening decades helped to reify the biological distinctions, generating a taller elite and a shorter underclass, but with little relation to the gene pools that had existed a few centuries ago. The social categories are thus real, but there is little if any detectable genetic differentiation between Hutu and Tutsi.

Tishkoff et al. (2009) found their mixed Hutu and Tutsi samples from Rwanda to be predominantly of Bantu origin, with minor gene flow from Afro-Asiatic communities (17.7% Afro-Asiatic genes found in the mixed Hutu/Tutsi population).

Height

History

Prior to the arrival of colonists, Rwanda had been ruled by a Tutsi-dominated monarchy since the 15th century. In 1897, Germany established a presence in Rwanda with the formation of an alliance with the king, beginning the colonial era. Later, Belgium took control in 1916 during World War I. Both European nations ruled through the Rwandan king and perpetuated a pro-Tutsi policy.

In Burundi, meanwhile, Tutsi domination was even more entrenched. A ruling faction, the Ganwa, soon emerged from amongst the Tutsi and assumed effective control of the country's administration.

Rwanda was ruled as a colony by Germany (from 1897 to 1916) and by Belgium (from 1922 to 1961). Both the Tutsi and Hutu had been the traditional governing elite, but both colonial powers allowed only the Tutsi to be educated and to participate in the colonial government. Such discriminatory policies engendered resentment.

When the Belgians took over, they believed it could be better governed if they continued to identify the different populations. In the 1920s, they required people to identify with a particular ethnic group and classified them accordingly in censuses.

In 1959, Belgium reversed its stance and allowed the majority Hutu to assume control of the government through universal elections after independence. This partly reflected internal Belgian domestic politics, in which the discrimination against the Hutu majority came to be regarded as similar to oppression within Belgium stemming from the Flemish-Walloon conflict, and the democratization and empowerment of the Hutu was seen as a just response to the Tutsi domination. Belgian policies wavered and flip-flopped considerably during this period leading up to independence of Burundi and Rwanda.

Independence of Rwanda and Burundi (1962)
The Hutu majority in Rwanda had revolted against the Tutsi and was able to take power. Tutsis fled and created exile communities outside Rwanda in Uganda and Tanzania.  Their actions led to the deaths of up to 200,000 Hutus. Overt discrimination from the colonial period was continued by different Rwandan and Burundian governments, including identity cards that distinguished Tutsi and Hutu.

Burundian genocide (1993)

In 1993, Burundi's first democratically elected president, Melchior Ndadaye, a Hutu, was assassinated by Tutsi officers, as was the person entitled to succeed him under the constitution. This sparked a genocide in Burundi between Hutu political structures and the Tutsi military, in which "possibly as many as 25,000 Tutsi" were murdered by the former and "at least as many" Hutu were killed by the latter. Since the 2000 Arusha Peace Process, today in Burundi the Tutsi minority shares power in a more or less equitable manner with the Hutu majority. Traditionally, the Tutsi had held more economic power and controlled the military.

Rwandan genocide (1994)

A similar pattern of events took place in Rwanda, but there the Hutu came to power in 1962. They in turn often oppressed the Tutsi, who fled the country. After the anti-Tutsi violence around 1959–1961, Tutsis fled in large numbers.

These exile Tutsi communities gave rise to Tutsi rebel movements. The Rwandan Patriotic Front, mostly made up of exiled Tutsi living primarily in Uganda, attacked Rwanda in 1990 with the intention of taking back the power. The RPF had experience in organized irregular warfare from the Ugandan Bush War, and got much support from the government of Uganda. The initial RPF advance was halted by the lift of French arms to the Rwandan government. Attempts at peace culminated in the Arusha Accords.

The agreement broke down after the assassination of the Rwandan and Burundian Presidents, triggering a resumption of hostilities and the start of the Rwandan Genocide of 1994, in which the Hutu then in power killed an estimated 500,000–600,000 people, largely of Tutsi origin. Victorious in the aftermath of the genocide, the Tutsi-ruled RPF came to power in July 1994.

Culture

In the Rwanda territory, from the 15th century until 1961, the Tutsi were ruled by a king (the mwami). Belgium abolished the monarchy, following the national referendum that led to independence. By contrast, in the northwestern part of the country (predominantly Hutu), large regional landholders shared power, similar to Buganda society (in what is now Uganda).

Under their holy king, Tutsi culture traditionally revolved around administering justice and government. They were the only proprietors of cattle, and sustained themselves on their own products. Additionally, their lifestyle afforded them a lot of leisure time, which they spent cultivating the high arts of poetry, weaving and music. Due to the Tutsi's status as a dominant minority vis-a-vis the Hutu farmers and the other local inhabitants, this relationship has been likened to that between lords and serfs in feudal Europe.
According to Fage (2013), the Tutsi are serologically related to Bantu and Nilotic populations. This in turn rules out a possible Cushitic origin for the founding Tutsi-Hima ruling class in the lacustrine kingdoms. However, the royal burial customs of the latter kingdoms are quite similar to those practiced by the former Cushitic Sidama states in the southern Gibe region of Ethiopia. By contrast, Bantu populations to the north of the Tutsi-Hima in the mount Kenya area such as the Agikuyu were until modern times essentially without a king (instead having a stateless age set system which they adopted from cushitic peoples) while there were a number of Bantu kingdoms to the south of the Tutsi-Hima in Tanzania, all of which shared the Tutsi-Hima's chieftaincy pattern. Since the Cushitic Sidama kingdoms interacted with Nilotic groups, Fage thus proposes that the Tutsi may have descended from one such migrating Nilotic population. The Tutsis' Nilotic ancestors would thereby in earlier times have served as cultural intermediaries, adopting some monarchical traditions from adjacent Cushitic kingdoms and subsequently taking those borrowed customs south with them when they first settled amongst Bantu autochthones in the Great Lakes area. However, little difference can be ascertained between the cultures today of the Tutsi and Hutu; both groups speak the same Bantu language. The rate of intermarriage between the two groups was traditionally very high, and relations were amicable until the 20th century. Many scholars have concluded that the determination of Tutsi was and is mainly an expression of class or caste, rather than ethnicity. Rwandans have their own language, Kinyarwanda. English, French and Swahili serve as additional official languages for different historic reasons, and are widely spoken by Rwandans as a second language. They also have a very strong genealogical memory, with the ability to recall the names of at least six previous generations, based on their knowledge of their ancestry. In their culture, morning, afternoon, and evening greetings are different. Tutsi and Hutu families are patrilineal (surnames are passed down from male to male). In the past, most people had arranged marriages with people of the same social class. Today, Tutsi people can choose whom they want to marry. Group activities are a common couple date. However, some young Tutsis in the city are experimenting with Western dating and clubbing.

Tutsi in the Congo
There are essentially two groups of Tutsi in the Congo (DRC). There is the Banyamulenge, who live in the southern tip of South Kivu. They are descendants of migrating Rwandan, Burundian and Tanzanian pastoralists. And secondly there are Tutsi in Masisi North Kivu and Kalehe in South Kivu – being part of the Banyarwanda (Hutu and Tutsi) community. These are not Banyamulenge. Some of these Banyarwanda are descendants of people that lived long before colonial rule in Rutshuru and in Masisi – on what is currently Congolese territory. Others migrated or were "transplanted" by the Belgian colonists from Rutshuru or from Rwanda and mostly settled in Masisi in North Kivu and Kalehe in South Kivu.

Notable people

 Paul Kagame
 Stromae
 Michel Micombero
 Jean Baptiste Bagaza
 Pierre Buyoya
 James Kabarebe
 Louise Mushikiwabo
 Benjamin Sehene
 Saido Berahino
 Gaël Bigirimana
 Cécile Kayirebwa

References

External links

 "Tutsi" at everyculture.com
 The International Criminal Tribunal for Rwanda (the status and judgments of all cases before the ICTR are available here)